Kintaro may refer to:

 , legendary child, a folk hero from Japanese folklore; a fictionalized version of Sakata no Kintoki, samurai from the Heian period
 Kintarō doll, a toy offered to Japanese children during the Tango no Sekku holiday
 Kintarō-ame, a traditional candy with a cylinder shape still produced in Japan and coming from the Edo period
 Kintaro (Mortal Kombat), a character in the Mortal Kombat fighting game franchise
 Kintarō Hattori (1860–1934), founder of the Seiko company
 Kintarō Okamura (1867–1935), a Japanese botanist
 Kintaros, a bear Imagin in Kamen Rider Den-O
 Kintaro Oe, the main character from Golden Boy (manga)

See also
 Golden Boy (disambiguation)

Japanese masculine given names